The eighteenth season of Deutschland sucht den Superstar began on 5 January 2021 on RTL. the jury consisted of Dieter Bohlen only for audtitions and "Recalls" Mike Singer, Maite Kelly and Michael Wendler; Wendler was excluded after the first audition because of his statements about the COVID-19 outbreak in Germany. Before the live shows began, Dieter Bohlen was excluded from the jury, his place took Thomas Gottschalk. Oliver Geissen returned as the host. For the first time all top 4 consists of male competitors. Jan Marten-Block was announced as the winner of the season.

Finalists

Live shows/Elimination chart

Color key

Week 1 - Semi-Final: Top 9
Original airdate: 27 March 2021

Week 2 - Final: Top 4 (Solo song, Favorite performance & Winner's single)
Original airdate: 3 April 2021
The final result was announced after all four contestants performed their three songs.

References

External links 
 Official website

Season 18
2021 in German music
2021 German television seasons